Canthydrus is a genus of beetles in the family Noteridae, containing the following species:

 Canthydrus alluaudi Régimbart, 1906
 Canthydrus andobonensis Guignot, 1960
 Canthydrus angustus Guignot, 1957
 Canthydrus antonellae Toledo, 2003
 Canthydrus apicicornis Régimbart, 1895
 Canthydrus arabicus Sharp, 1882
 Canthydrus bakeri Peschet, 1921
 Canthydrus bellus Régimbart, 1895
 Canthydrus birmanicus Guignot, 1956
 Canthydrus bisignatus Wehncke, 1883
 Canthydrus blanditus Guignot, 1959
 Canthydrus bovillae Blackburn, 1890
 Canthydrus buqueti (Laporte, 1835)
 Canthydrus concolor Sharp, 1882
 Canthydrus diophthalmus (Reiche & Saulcy, 1855)
 Canthydrus edanus Guignot, 1953
 Canthydrus ephemeralis Watts, 2001
 Canthydrus festivus Régimbart, 1888
 Canthydrus flammulatus Sharp, 1882
 Canthydrus flavomaculatus Gschwendtner, 1930
 Canthydrus flavosignatus Régimbart, 1903
 Canthydrus flavus (Motschulsky, 1855)
 Canthydrus gibberosus Guignot, 1951
 Canthydrus gracilis Bilardo & Rocchi, 1990
 Canthydrus guttula (Aubé, 1838)
 Canthydrus haagi (Wehncke, 1876)
 Canthydrus imitator Guignot, 1942
 Canthydrus irenicus Guignot, 1955
 Canthydrus koppi Wehncke, 1883
 Canthydrus laccophiloides Gschwendtner, 1930
 Canthydrus laetabilis (Walker, 1858)
 Canthydrus luctuosus (Aubé, 1838)
 Canthydrus maculatus Wehncke, 1883
 Canthydrus minutus Régimbart, 1895
 Canthydrus moneres Guignot, 1955
 Canthydrus morsbachi (Wehncke, 1876)
 Canthydrus morulus Omer-Cooper, 1931
 Canthydrus natalensis J.Balfour-Browne, 1939
 Canthydrus nigerrimus Omer-Cooper, 1957
 Canthydrus nitidulus Sharp, 1882
 Canthydrus notula (Erichson, 1843)
 Canthydrus octoguttatus Zimmermann, 1921
 Canthydrus politus (Sharp, 1873)
 Canthydrus procurvus Guignot, 1942
 Canthydrus proximus Sharp, 1882
 Canthydrus pseudomorsbachi Vazirani, 1969
 Canthydrus quadriguttatus Guignot, 1955
 Canthydrus quadrivittatus (Boheman, 1848)
 Canthydrus rasilis Guignot, 1942
 Canthydrus ritsemae (Régimbart, 1880)
 Canthydrus rocchii Wewalka, 1992
 Canthydrus rossanae Bilardo & Rocchi, 1987
 Canthydrus rubropictus Régimbart, 1895
 Canthydrus ruficollis Régimbart, 1895
 Canthydrus sedilloti Régimbart, 1895
 Canthydrus semperi (Wehncke, 1876)
 Canthydrus sepulcralis Guignot, 1956
 Canthydrus serialis Fauvel, 1883
 Canthydrus testaceus (Boheman, 1858)
 Canthydrus ugandae J.Balfour-Browne, 1939
 Canthydrus uniformis Zimmermann, 1921
 Canthydrus verbekei Guignot, 1959
 Canthydrus weisei (Wehncke, 1876)
 Canthydrus xanthinus Régimbart, 1895

References

Noteridae
Adephaga genera